Za Rulem (Russian: Behind the steering wheel) is a popular Russian monthly magazine about cars and the automotive industry. Before 1989, it was the only automobile periodical in the USSR, designed for a wide readership. By the end of 1980 the magazine's circulation reached 4.5 million copies.

History and profile
Za Rulem was founded on 23 February 1928, and the first issue was published in April 1928.

Quote from the first issue :

The following artists involved in the design of the magazine: Boris Efimov and Alexander Zakharov (1976-1988). Vladimir Mayakovsky also worked for the magazine.

During Soviet times, the magazine was a 30-leaf notebook of simple matte paper, but in the 1990s, they began to add more pages. In May 2008, the magazine began to use the new spelling of the logo, due to the fact that the old style of the journal title had been used since the 1970s.

Za Rulem is published by a publishing company with the same name on a monthly basis. In August 2009, the publisher created a new website. Since January 2010 the editor in chief has been Anton Chuykin (previously Peter Menshikh was in the post).

460,500 copies of Za Rulem were circulating during the period of 2010-2011, making it the sixth best-selling European automobile magazine.

Other projects of the publishing house
 Newspaper Za Rulem-Region. First produced in 2001, and had a distinctive feature of the project; the ability to publish newspapers differently in different regions.
 Moto magazine. The first motorcycle magazine in Russia, which has been published since 1991.
 Kupi avto magazine. A magazine targeted for those who are potential car buyers. It explores the properties, options and prices for consumers.
 Reis magazine. The first issue of this magazine was published in 2007, and it is intended for professionals, managers, and owners of companies operating trucks and buses. In addition to economic issues in the publication on the professional level, it addresses the selection of vehicle composition, maintenance and repair of equipment, choice of tires, oil, supplies, leasing and loan processing, accounting, tax planning, insurance, and personnel policy formation.
 kupiauto.ru website. Site where using various tools you can pick up a car in purpose and characteristics, calculate the cost of operation.
 Electronic encyclopedia "Za Rulem". Internet encyclopedia, which contains materials on the devices of a vehicle, operation, components, safety, branded cars, and the people who played important roles in the automotive industry.
 Trucks. Annual catalog of trucks
 World of car tires and wheels. Annual catalog
 World automotive chemicals and cosmetics. Annual catalog
 Also available publishing encyclopedias and books automotive repair certain models of cars, textbooks, atlases highways.

Interesting facts
 In June 1990, the publishing house "Za Rulem" was released magazine "Motorsport", which became the first in the USSR magazine devoted entirely to the global automotive and Motorcycle Championship. The magazine lasted until February 1998.
 Since 1994, the publishing house "Za Rulem" holds the Grand Prix. The purpose of the competition is to identify among the novelties of the year the best and most perfec in voting participation readers. In the last issue of the year published a list of the winning car by classes.
 From 1978 to 1994 and from 2006 to the present time the magazine holds "Race Stars". The main prize - Crystal tire.
 Each January issue of the magazine is thinner than the rest, and each December the list of articles for all 12 rooms of this year (in the December issue of 2010 this tradition was interrupted, and a list of articles was posted on the official website)
 Before publishing "Za Rulem" the magazine published "Limousine." Later the magazine closed.
 In the section "Tips experienced" (formerly "chauffeur savvy", where readers send in tips on maintenance and repair of vehicles) in January 2002 give prizes for the best advice.
 Since January 2003, in each room under the heading "Our competition" publish task and at the end of each task award holder best response to it.

References

External links 
 Website of publishing house and magazine
 archive "Za Rulem" magazine since 1928

1928 establishments in Russia
Magazines established in 1928
Monthly magazines published in Russia
Automobile magazines published in Russia
Russian-language magazines
Magazines published in the Soviet Union